These are playoff results for the Premier Basketball League (PBL).

2008

2009

Bracket

Individual game results

Play-in game: #5 Vermont Frost Heaves vs. #4 Wilmington Sea Dawgs
Wilmington 96, Vermont 90: April 1, Schwartz Center, Wilmington, North Carolina

Best-of-3 Semifinals

#4 Wilmington Sea Dawgs vs. #1 Battle Creek Knights
Game 1: Wilmington 112, Battle Creek 108: April 3, Schwartz Center, Wilmington, North Carolina
Game 2: Battle Creek 111, Wilmington 90: April 5, Kellogg Arena, Battle Creek, Michigan
Game 3: Battle Creek 119, Wilmington 112: April 6, Kellogg Arena, Battle Creek, Michigan

#3 Manchester Millrats vs. #2 Rochester Razorsharks
Game 1: Rochester 125, Manchester 110: April 2, Southern New Hampshire Fieldhouse, Manchester, New Hampshire
Game 2: Manchester 116, Rochester 110: April 5, Blue Cross Arena, Rochester, New York
Game 3: Rochester 110, Manchester 103: April 11, Blue Cross Arena, Rochester, New York

PBL Finals*: #2 Rochester Razorsharks vs. #1 Battle Creek Knights
Rochester 152, Battle Creek 115: April 19, Blue Cross Arena, Rochester, New York

* Instead of a planned 3 game series with home court advantage going to the Battle Creek Knights, the league changed the format to a single game series.

2010

Bracket

Individual Game Results

PBL Semifinals

#4 Halifax Rainmen vs. #1 Lawton-Fort Sill Cavalry
Game 1: Lawton-Fort Sill  108, Halifax 104: April 15, Halifax Metro Centre, Halifax, Nova Scotia
Game 2: Lawton-Fort Sill  135, Halifax 104: April 18, Great Plains Coliseum, Lawton, Oklahoma

#3 Puerto Rico Capitanes vs. #2 Rochester Razorsharks
Game 1: Rochester 119, Puerto Rico 95: April 14, Manuel "Petaca" Iguina Coliseum, Arecibo, Puerto Rico
Game 2: Rochester 132, Puerto Rico 108: April 18, Blue Cross Arena, Rochester, New York

PBL Finals: #2 Rochester Razorsharks vs. #1 Lawton-Fort Sill Cavalry
Game 1: Rochester 110, Lawton-Fort Sill 106 (OT): April 22, Blue Cross Arena, Rochester, New York
Game 2: Lawton-Fort Sill 95, Rochester 84: April 25, Great Plains Coliseum, Lawton, Oklahoma
Game 3: Lawton-Fort Sill 124, Rochester 108: April 27, Great Plains Coliseum, Lawton, Oklahoma

2011

Bracket

2012

Bracket

2013

Bracket

Premier Basketball League